Halina Balon (born 18 April 1948) is a Polish fencer. She competed in the women's individual and team foil events at the 1968 and 1972 Summer Olympics.

References

1948 births
Living people
Polish female fencers
Olympic fencers of Poland
Fencers at the 1968 Summer Olympics
Fencers at the 1972 Summer Olympics
Sportspeople from Katowice
20th-century Polish women